Against the Tide (Chinese: 逆潮) is a psychological thriller drama produced by MediaCorp Channel 8. This drama features different crime cases. The show aired at 9pm on weekdays and had a repeat telecast at 8am the following day. The Series is repeated at 12pm to 2pm on Channel 8 on  Sunday. Each case lasts 3-5 episodes and features a main character of the case. The drama began production in March 2014 and wrapped up its filming in May 2014. It was aired from 24 September 2014 to 24 October 2014 and has a total of 23 episodes. This series repeated at 12pm on Tuesday to Saturday in 8 December 2021.

Plot
Acclaimed novelist Di Shen's mission is to expose evil in humans, as he believes that all humans are born depraved. While Di Shen is doing a television interview, a girl escapes her captivity in which she was tortured and abused. As police officers Zhou Jianfeng and Guo Jingcheng fail to obtain information from the girl, they ask for help from the psychiatrist Qiu Xueqing who, through hypnosis reveals that the assailant had a copy of Di Shen's novel. Xueqing asks the novelist to help solve the case believing that the culprit is an imitator of his novels, but for Jianfeng, Di shen is the main suspect.

Cast

Main cast

Qiu (Xueqing) family

Police Headquarters

Zhou (Jianfeng) family

Serial Kidnapping incident (ep 1-3)

Tear Gas Bombing incident (ep 3-6)

Vampire Hunter (ep 6-8)

Missing Girls Case (ep 9-11)

Hammering Assault incident (ep 11-14)

'Forest-Hunt' murder case (ep 15-19)

Confining Girls Incident (ep 15-17)

New 'Shadow Walker' organisation (ep 18-20)

Turning Evil (ep 20-23)

Viewerships
Against The Tide had an average of 937,000 views, becoming the 7th most watched drama series of 2014, following behind Three Wishes, C.L.I.F. 3, The Caregivers, Blessings, The Journey: Tumultuous Times, and World at Your Feet. Viewership in 2014 increased significantly, with the top-rated drama serial of 2013, C.L.I.F. 2, only having 901,000 viewers, and the top 10 drama serials having at least 930,000.

Trivia
Christopher Lee's 2014 drama series after Game Plan.
Carrie Wong's debut MediaCorp Channel 8 drama and first villainous and dual role, where she plays a villain due to mental illness.
Rui En's first villainous role, where she plays a villain at the end of the drama. It is also the first time she will portray a psychiatrist. In the series, she also steps into the mind of the criminal concerned.
 Zhang Zhenhuan's first villainous role.
 Paige Chua's first villainous role.
 Aloysius Pang's first villainous role, where he played a villain due to mental illness.
This will be the first series to have five of the "8 Dukes of Caldecott Hill" appear.
Snippets of the next episode were shown during the ending credits of each episode, but in rewind motion. 
Ian Fang was reportedly offered a role in the series, but turned it down so that he could take a break.
The series was mentioned twice by Dennis Chew in 118. In episode 92, he mentioned that the characters in the series killed people using knives, while in episode 201, he mentioned Rui En could not be differentiated between a good woman and a bad woman.

Awards & Nominations

Star Awards 2015
Against The Tide has the second most number of nominations for Star Awards 2015 behind The Journey: Tumultuous Times with 16 nominations in 13 awards, winning 3 of them - Best Programme Promo, Best Director and Best Cameraman.

See also
 List of Against The Tide episodes
List of MediaCorp Channel 8 Chinese drama series (2010s)

References

Singapore Chinese dramas
2014 Singaporean television series debuts
2014 Singaporean television series endings
Channel 8 (Singapore) original programming